Ahasin Polowata (English: White Flowers for the Dead) is a 1978 Sri Lankan drama film directed by Dr Lester James Peries and written by Tissa Abeysekara. The film stars Tony Ranasinghe as Sarath, an abusive husband who is haunted by his wife's death.

Peries made the film as a favour to D. B. I. S. Siriwardene who was ardent that Peries direct a film based on his wife, Eileen's book. It was well received in Sri Lanka, critically and commercially, and made appearances at several foreign film festivals including the Cairo International Film Festival where it won the Best Film from the Third World award.

Plot
Dr.Sarath (Tony Ranasinghe) domineers over his timid wife Vineetha (Sriyani Amarasena). When she is to have a Caesarean delivery of their baby, Sarath refuses to be present even though he himself is a doctor. She dies during surgery and Sarath is forced to live with the spectre of his wife hanging over him.

Cast
 Tony Ranasinghe as Sarath
 Sriyani Amarasena as Vineetha
 Vijaya Kumaratunga as Sarath's friend, Lalith
 Vasanthi Chathurani as Pushpa, Vineetha's sister
 Rukmani Devi as Sarath's aunt
 Thalatha Gunasekara
 Shanthi Lekha
 D. R. Nanayakkara
 Geetha Kumarasinghe
 Eddie Junior
 Ajith Jinadasa
 Asanka Monarawila
 Mapa Gunaratne
 Ebert Wijesinghe
 Daya Alwis

Awards 

 Most outstanding film from a third world country at the 3rd International Film Festival in Cairo in 1978.
 Best Actor Presidential Film Awards 1979 - Tony Ranasinghe.
 Best Direction Presidential Film Awards 1979 - Lester James Peries.
 Best Editor Presidential Film Awards 1979 - Sumithra Peris.
 Best Cinematographer Presidential Film Awards 1979 - Donald Karunarathna. 
 Best Script Writer Presidential Film Awards 1979 - Tissa Abeysekara.
 Best Playback Singer Female Presidential Film Awards 1979 - Rukmani Devi ( "Doi Doi" ).

References

External links

1978 films
Films directed by Lester James Peries